Mariano Díaz Díaz (17 September 1939 – 5 April 2014) was a Spanish professional road bicycle racer. In 1967, he won a stage of the 1967 Vuelta a España, and also won the mountains classification. He also competed in the individual road race and team time trial events at the 1964 Summer Olympics.

Major results

1963
 1st  Overall Vuelta a Navarra
1964
 1st  Overall Vuelta a Navarra
1965
 1st  Overall Tour de l'Avenir
1st  Mountains classification
1st Stages 2 & 10
 1st  Overall Vuelta a Navarra
 3rd Overall Circuit de la Sarthe
 7th Subida al Naranco
1966
 1st  Overall Vuelta a los Valles Mineros
 1st Stage 5 Eibarko Bizikleta
 1st Stage 4 
 4th Subida al Naranco
 10th Overall Volta a Catalunya
1967
 9th Overall Vuelta a España
1st  Mountains classification
1st Stage 11
1968
 1st  Overall Vuelta a Levante
 1st  Overall Setmana Catalana de Ciclisme
 4th Overall Tour de Romandie
 5th Overall Eibarko Bizikleta
1969
 1st  Overall Volta a Catalunya
 1st Stage 7 Tour de France
 1st Stage 15 Vuelta a España
 1st Stage 7 Tour de Suisse
 3rd Overall Tour of the Basque Country
 3rd 
 3rd GP Leganés

References

External links 

1939 births
2014 deaths
People from Villarejo de Salvanés
Cyclists from the Community of Madrid
Spanish male cyclists
Spanish Tour de France stage winners
Spanish Vuelta a España stage winners
Cyclists at the 1964 Summer Olympics
Olympic cyclists of Spain
Tour de Suisse stage winners